Canadian Film Makers is a Canadian short film television series which aired on CBC Television in 1974.

Premise
Like its namesake CBC series in 1967, Canadian Film Makers presented various short films during its run. This time, films were solely from independent producers and excluded content from production companies such as the National Film Board of Canada. The CBC paid the producers $3000–3500 per half-hour of film chosen from submitted entries, which were to meet legal and technical requirements.

Scheduling
This half-hour series was broadcast Sundays at 2:30 p.m. (Eastern) from 6 January to 31 March 1974. In the following season, independent films were featured in the new series Sprockets under producer by Julius Kohanyi.

Episodes

Films presented in this series included:

 Amherst Island (Gil Taylor)
 As We Were (Marty Gross)
 Carpathian Tales (Jerzy Fijalkowski)
 Country Music Montreal (Frank Vitale)
 Good Friday in Little Italy (Peter Rowe)
 Limestoned (René Bonnière)
 Not Far From Home (Don Owen)
 The Novitiate (Warren Zucker)
 Progressive Insanities of a Pioneer Farmer (Paul Quigley)
 Space Child (Dennis Millar)
 To A Very Old Woman (Paul Quigley)

References

External links
 

CBC Television original programming
1974 Canadian television series debuts
1974 Canadian television series endings